The 2007 Kvalserien was the 33rd edition of the Kvalserien. It determined two teams of the participating ones would play in the 2007–08 Elitserien season and which four teams would play in the 2007–08 HockeyAllsvenskan season.

Tournament

External links
Tournament on hockeyarchives.info

Kvalserien
Kval